Pseudagrion hageni is a species of damselfly in the family Coenagrionidae. Common names include painted sprite and Hagen's sprite. It is found from South Africa to Kenya, Uganda, the Democratic Republic of the Congo and Angola (including Mozambique, Zimbabwe, Zambia, Malawi, and Tanzania). Its natural habitats are shaded streams in subtropical or tropical forest, thicket and bush.

References

External links

 Pseudagrion hageni on African Dragonflies and Damselflies Online

Coenagrionidae
Insects described in 1893
Taxonomy articles created by Polbot